The 2012 season of the Meistriliiga the first level in the Estonian football system is the 22nd season in the league's history. The competition started on 10 March 2012 and will end on 3 November 2012. The defending champions are Flora, who won their ninth league championship last year.

Teams
Ajax finished the 2011 season in 10th place and were directly relegated to the Esiliiga, ending a one-year stay in the Estonian top flight. They were replaced by Tallinna Kalev, who return to the league after a two-year absence.

In addition, the 9th-placed Meistriliiga club, Kuressaare, faced the runners-up of the Esiliiga, Infonet, in a two-legged play-off for a spot in this season's competition. Kuressaare won the play-off, 5–1 on aggregate, retaining their spot in the league.

Stadiums and locations

Personnel and kits
Note: Flags indicate national team as has been defined under FIFA eligibility rules. Players and Managers may hold more than one non-FIFA nationality.

Managerial changes

League table

Relegation play-off
At season's end, the ninth place club in the Meistriliiga will participate in a two-legged playoff with the runners-up of the 2012 Esiliiga for one spot in next year's competition.

 Tallinna Kalev retains their place in the league, winning 3–1 on aggregate.

Results
Each team plays every opponent four times, twice at home and twice on the road, for a total of 36 games.

First half of season

Second half of season

Season statistics

Top scorers

Hat-tricks

 5 Player scored 5 goals.

Awards

See also
2011–12 Estonian Cup
2012–13 Estonian Cup

References

Meistriliiga seasons
1
Estonia
Estonia